Chen Yanhao (born 2 January 1972) is a retired Chinese hurdler who competed in the 1996 Summer Olympics.

He won the bronze medal at the 1990 Asian Junior Championships, the silver medal at the 1993 Asian Championships, the silver medal at the 1994 Asian Games, the gold medal at the 1995 and 1998 Asian Championships and the 1998 Asian Games and also the silver medals at the 1997 and 2001 East Asian Games.

On the world stage he finished fifth at the 1998 IAAF World Cup and competed at the 1995 World Indoor Championships, the 1996 Olympic Games, the 1997 World Indoor Championships and the 1999 World Championships without reaching the final.

His personal best time was 13.37 seconds, achieved in May 2001 in Shanghai.

References

1972 births
Living people
Chinese male hurdlers
Olympic athletes of China
Athletes (track and field) at the 1996 Summer Olympics
World Athletics Championships athletes for China
Athletes (track and field) at the 1994 Asian Games
Athletes (track and field) at the 1998 Asian Games
Asian Games silver medalists for China
Asian Games gold medalists for China
Asian Games medalists in athletics (track and field)
Medalists at the 1994 Asian Games
Medalists at the 1998 Asian Games
Runners from Shanghai